Lisztomania was the intense fan frenzy directed toward Franz Liszt during his performances.

Lisztomania may also refer to:

 Lisztomania (film), a 1975 film by Ken Russell, about Franz Liszt 
 Lisztomania (album), a soundtrack album from the film, by Rick Wakeman
 "Lisztomania" (song), a song by Phoenix

See also

 Liszt (disambiguation)
 Mania (disambiguation)
 List of manias